Clinton Richard Dawkins  (born 26 March 1941) is a British evolutionary biologist and author. He is an emeritus fellow of New College, Oxford, and was Professor for Public Understanding of Science in the University of Oxford from 1995 to 2008. His 1976 book The Selfish Gene popularised the gene-centred view of evolution. Dawkins has won several academic and writing awards.

In The Selfish Gene Dawkins says that life evolves by the differential survival of replicating entities. With his book The Extended Phenotype (1982), he introduced into evolutionary biology the influential concept that the phenotypic effects of a gene are not necessarily limited to an organism's body, but can stretch far into the environment; an example is when a beaver builds a dam. This book and The Selfish Gene also introduced the term meme. 

Dawkins is well known for his criticism of creationism and intelligent design as well as for being a vocal atheist. Dawkins wrote The Blind Watchmaker in 1986, arguing against the watchmaker analogy, an argument for the existence of a supernatural creator based upon the complexity of living organisms. Instead, he describes evolutionary processes as analogous to a blind watchmaker, in that reproduction, mutation, and selection are unguided by any sentient designer. In 2006, Dawkins published The God Delusion, contending that a supernatural creator almost certainly does not exist and that religious faith is a delusion. He founded the Richard Dawkins Foundation for Reason and Science in 2006.

Dawkins has published two volumes of memoirs, An Appetite for Wonder (2013) and Brief Candle in the Dark (2015).

Background

Early life 

Clinton Richard Dawkins was born on 26 March 1941 in Nairobi, the capital of Kenya during British colonial rule. Dawkins later dropped Clinton from his name by deed poll. He is the son of Jean Mary Vyvyan (née Ladner; 1916–2019) and Clinton John Dawkins (1915–2010), an agricultural civil servant in the British Colonial Service in Nyasaland (present-day Malawi), of an Oxfordshire landed gentry family. His father was called up into the King's African Rifles during the Second World War and returned to England in 1949, when Dawkins was eight. His father had inherited a country estate, Over Norton Park in Oxfordshire, which he farmed commercially. Dawkins lives in Oxford, England. He has a younger sister, Sarah.

His parents were interested in natural sciences, and they answered Dawkins's questions in scientific terms. Dawkins describes his childhood as "a normal Anglican upbringing". He embraced Christianity until halfway through his teenage years, at which point he concluded that the theory of evolution alone was a better explanation for life's complexity, and ceased believing in a god. Dawkins states: "The main residual reason why I was religious was from being so impressed with the complexity of life and feeling that it had to have a designer, and I think it was when I realised that Darwinism was a far superior explanation that pulled the rug out from under the argument of design. And that left me with nothing." This understanding of atheism combined with his western cultural background, informs Dawkins as he describes himself in several interviews as a "cultural Christian" and a "cultural Anglican".

Education 

On his return to England from Nyasaland in 1949, at the age of eight, Dawkins joined Chafyn Grove School, in Wiltshire, and after that from 1954 to 1959 attended Oundle School in Northamptonshire, an English public school with a Church of England ethos, where he was in Laundimer House. While at Oundle, Dawkins read Bertrand Russell's Why I Am Not a Christian for the first time. He studied zoology at Balliol College, Oxford, graduating in 1962; while there, he was tutored by Nobel Prize-winning ethologist Nikolaas Tinbergen. He graduated with upper-class second honours.

Dawkins continued as a research student under Tinbergen's supervision, receiving his Doctor of Philosophy degree by 1966, and remained a research assistant for another year. Tinbergen was a pioneer in the study of animal behaviour, particularly in the areas of instinct, learning, and choice; Dawkins's research in this period concerned models of animal decision-making. He was awarded a DSc by Oxford in 1989.

Teaching 

From 1967 to 1969, Dawkins was an assistant professor of zoology at the University of California, Berkeley. During this period, the students and faculty at UC Berkeley were largely opposed to the ongoing Vietnam War, and Dawkins became involved in the anti-war demonstrations and activities. He returned to the University of Oxford in 1970 as a lecturer. In 1990, he became a reader in zoology. In 1995, he was appointed Simonyi Professor for the Public Understanding of Science at Oxford, a position that had been endowed by Charles Simonyi with the express intention that the holder "be expected to make important contributions to the public understanding of some scientific field", and that its first holder should be Richard Dawkins. He held that professorship from 1995 until 2008.

Since 1970, he has been a fellow of New College, Oxford, and he is now an emeritus fellow. He has delivered many lectures, including the Henry Sidgwick Memorial Lecture (1989), the first Erasmus Darwin Memorial Lecture (1990), the Michael Faraday Lecture (1991), the T. H. Huxley Memorial Lecture (1992), the Irvine Memorial Lecture (1997), the Tinbergen Lecture (2004), and the Tanner Lectures (2003). In 1991, he gave the Royal Institution Christmas Lectures for Children on Growing Up in the Universe. He also has edited several journals, and has acted as an editorial advisor to the Encarta Encyclopedia and the Encyclopedia of Evolution. He is listed as a senior editor and a columnist of the Council for Secular Humanism's Free Inquiry magazine, and has been a member of the editorial board of Skeptic magazine since its foundation.

Dawkins has sat on judging panels for awards as diverse as the Royal Society's Faraday Award and the British Academy Television Awards, and has been president of the Biological Sciences section of the British Association for the Advancement of Science. In 2004, Balliol College, Oxford, instituted the Dawkins Prize, awarded for "outstanding research into the ecology and behaviour of animals whose welfare and survival may be endangered by human activities". In September 2008, he retired from his professorship, announcing plans to "write a book aimed at youngsters in which he will warn them against believing in 'anti-scientific' fairytales."

In 2011, Dawkins joined the professoriate of the New College of the Humanities, a private university in London established by A. C. Grayling, which opened in September 2012.

Work

Evolutionary biology

Dawkins is best known for his popularisation of the gene as the principal unit of selection in evolution; this view is most clearly set out in two of his books:
 The Selfish Gene (1976), in which he notes that "all life evolves by the differential survival of replicating entities".
 The Extended Phenotype (1982), in which he describes natural selection as "the process whereby replicators out-propagate each other". He introduces to a wider audience the influential concept he presented in 1977, that the phenotypic effects of a gene are not necessarily limited to an organism's body, but can stretch far into the environment, including the bodies of other organisms. Dawkins regarded the extended phenotype as his single most important contribution to evolutionary biology and he considered niche construction to be a special case of extended phenotype. The concept of extended phenotype helps explain evolution, but it does not help predict specific outcomes.

Dawkins has consistently been sceptical about non-adaptive processes in evolution (such as spandrels, described by Gould and Lewontin) and about selection at levels "above" that of the gene. He is particularly sceptical about the practical possibility or importance of group selection as a basis for understanding altruism.

Altruism appears at first to be an evolutionary paradox, since helping others costs precious resources and decreases one's own chances for survival, or "fitness". Previously, many had interpreted altruism as an aspect of group selection, suggesting that individuals are doing what is best for the survival of the population or species as a whole. British evolutionary biologist W. D. Hamilton used gene-frequency analysis in his inclusive fitness theory to show how hereditary altruistic traits can evolve if there is sufficient genetic similarity between actors and recipients of such altruism, including close relatives. Hamilton's inclusive fitness has since been successfully applied to a wide range of organisms, including humans. Similarly, Robert Trivers, thinking in terms of the gene-centred model, developed the theory of reciprocal altruism, whereby one organism provides a benefit to another in the expectation of future reciprocation. Dawkins popularised these ideas in The Selfish Gene, and developed them in his own work.

In June 2012, Dawkins was highly critical of fellow biologist E. O. Wilson's 2012 book The Social Conquest of Earth as misunderstanding Hamilton's theory of kin selection. Dawkins has also been strongly critical of the Gaia hypothesis of the independent scientist James Lovelock.

Critics of Dawkins's biological approach suggest that taking the gene as the unit of selection (a single event in which an individual either succeeds or fails to reproduce) is misleading. The gene could be better described, they say, as a unit of evolution (the long-term changes in allele frequencies in a population). In The Selfish Gene, Dawkins explains that he is using George C. Williams's definition of the gene as "that which segregates and recombines with appreciable frequency". Another common objection is that a gene cannot survive alone, but must cooperate with other genes to build an individual, and therefore a gene cannot be an independent "unit". In The Extended Phenotype, Dawkins suggests that from an individual gene's viewpoint, all other genes are part of the environment to which it is adapted.

Advocates for higher levels of selection (such as Richard Lewontin, David Sloan Wilson, and Elliott Sober) suggest that there are many phenomena (including altruism) that gene-based selection cannot satisfactorily explain. The philosopher Mary Midgley, with whom Dawkins clashed in print concerning The Selfish Gene, has criticised gene selection, memetics, and sociobiology as being excessively reductionist; she has suggested that the popularity of Dawkins's work is due to factors in the Zeitgeist such as the increased individualism of the Thatcher/Reagan decades. Besides, other, more recent views and analysis on his popular science works also exist.

In a set of controversies over the mechanisms and interpretation of evolution (what has been called 'The Darwin Wars'), one faction is often named after Dawkins, while the other faction is named after the American palaeontologist Stephen Jay Gould, reflecting the pre-eminence of each as a populariser of the pertinent ideas. In particular, Dawkins and Gould have been prominent commentators in the controversy over sociobiology and evolutionary psychology, with Dawkins generally approving and Gould generally being critical. A typical example of Dawkins's position is his scathing review of Not in Our Genes by Steven Rose, Leon J. Kamin, and Richard C. Lewontin. Two other thinkers who are often considered to be allied with Dawkins on the subject are Steven Pinker and Daniel Dennett; Dennett has promoted a gene-centred view of evolution and defended reductionism in biology. Despite their academic disagreements, Dawkins and Gould did not have a hostile personal relationship, and Dawkins dedicated a large portion of his 2003 book A Devil's Chaplain posthumously to Gould, who had died the previous year.

When asked if Darwinism informs his everyday apprehension of life, Dawkins says, "In one way it does. My eyes are constantly wide open to the extraordinary fact of existence. Not just human existence but the existence of life and how this breathtakingly powerful process, which is natural selection, has managed to take the very simple facts of physics and chemistry and build them up to redwood trees and humans. That's never far from my thoughts, that sense of amazement. On the other hand, I certainly don't allow Darwinism to influence my feelings about human social life," implying that he feels that individual human beings can opt out of the survival machine of Darwinism since they are freed by the consciousness of self.

"Meme" as behavioural concept 

In his book The Selfish Gene, Dawkins coined the word meme (the behavioural equivalent of a gene) as a way to encourage readers to think about how Darwinian principles might be extended beyond the realm of genes. It was intended as an extension of his "replicators" argument, but it took on a life of its own in the hands of other authors, such as Daniel Dennett and Susan Blackmore. These popularisations then led to the emergence of memetics, a field from which Dawkins has distanced himself.

Dawkins's meme refers to any cultural entity that an observer might consider a replicator of a certain idea or set of ideas. He hypothesised that people could view many cultural entities as capable of such replication, generally through communication and contact with humans, who have evolved as efficient (although not perfect) copiers of information and behaviour. Because memes are not always copied perfectly, they might become refined, combined, or otherwise modified with other ideas; this results in new memes, which may themselves prove more or less efficient replicators than their predecessors, thus providing a framework for a hypothesis of cultural evolution based on memes, a notion that is analogous to the theory of biological evolution based on genes.

Although Dawkins invented the term meme, he has not claimed that the idea was entirely novel, and there have been other expressions for similar ideas in the past. For instance, John Laurent has suggested that the term may have derived from the work of the little-known German biologist Richard Semon. Semon regarded "mneme" as the collective set of neural memory traces (conscious or subconscious) that were inherited, although such view would be considered as Lamarckian by modern biologists. Laurent also found the use of the term mneme in Maurice Maeterlinck's The Life of the White Ant (1926), and Maeterlinck himself stated that he obtained the phrase from Semon's work. In his own work, Maeterlinck tried to explain memory in termites and ants by claiming that neural memory traces were added "upon the individual mneme". Nonetheless, James Gleick describes Dawkins's concept of the meme as "his most famous memorable invention, far more influential than his selfish genes or his later proselytising against religiosity".

Foundation 

In 2006, Dawkins founded the Richard Dawkins Foundation for Reason and Science (RDFRS), a non-profit organisation. RDFRS financed research on the psychology of belief and religion, financed scientific education programs and materials, and publicised and supported charitable organisations that are secular in nature. In January 2016, it was announced that the foundation was merging with the Center for Inquiry, with Dawkins becoming a member of the new organization's board of directors.

Criticism of religion

Dawkins was confirmed into the Church of England at the age of 13, but began to grow sceptical of the beliefs. He said that his understanding of science and evolutionary processes led him to question how adults in positions of leadership in a civilised world could still be so uneducated in biology, and is puzzled by how belief in God could remain among individuals who are sophisticated in science. Dawkins notes that some physicists use 'God' as a metaphor for the general awe-inspiring mysteries of the universe, which causes confusion and misunderstanding among people who incorrectly think they are talking about a mystical being who forgives sins, transubstantiates wine, or makes people live after they die.

He disagrees with Stephen Jay Gould's principle of nonoverlapping magisteria (NOMA) and suggests that the existence of God should be treated as a scientific hypothesis like any other. Dawkins became a prominent critic of religion and has stated his opposition to religion as twofold: religion is both a source of conflict and a justification for belief without evidence. He considers faith—belief that is not based on evidence—as "one of the world's great evils".

On his spectrum of theistic probability, which has seven levels between 1 (100% certainty that a God or gods exist) and 7 (100% certainty that a God or gods do not exist), Dawkins has said he is a 6.9, which represents a "de facto atheist" who thinks "I cannot know for certain but I think God is very improbable, and I live my life on the assumption that he is not there." When asked about his slight uncertainty, Dawkins quips, "I am agnostic to the extent that I am agnostic about fairies at the bottom of the garden." In May 2014, at the Hay Festival in Wales, Dawkins explained that while he does not believe in the supernatural elements of the Christian faith, he still has nostalgia for the ceremonial side of religion. In addition to beliefs in deities, Dawkins has criticized religious beliefs as irrational, such as that Jesus turned water into wine, that an embryo starts as a blob, that magic underwear will protect you, that Jesus was resurrected, that semen comes from the spine, that Jesus walked on water, that the sun sets in a marsh, that the Garden of Eden existed in Adam-ondi-Ahman, Missouri, that Jesus' mother was a virgin, that Muhammad split the moon, and that Lazarus was raised from the dead.

Dawkins has risen to prominence in public debates concerning science and religion since the publication of his most popular book, The God Delusion, in 2006, which became an international bestseller. As of 2015, more than three million copies have been sold and the book has been translated into over 30 languages. Its success has been seen by many as indicative of a change in the contemporary cultural zeitgeist and has also been identified with the rise of New Atheism. In the book, Dawkins contends that a supernatural creator almost certainly does not exist and that religious faith is a delusion—"a fixed false belief". In his February 2002 TED talk entitled "Militant atheism", Dawkins urged all atheists to openly state their position and to fight the incursion of the church into politics and science. On 30 September 2007, Dawkins, Christopher Hitchens, Sam Harris, and Daniel Dennett met at Hitchens's residence for a private, unmoderated discussion that lasted two hours. The event was videotaped and entitled "The Four Horsemen".

Dawkins sees education and consciousness-raising as the primary tools in opposing what he considers to be religious dogma and indoctrination. These tools include the fight against certain stereotypes, and he has adopted the term bright as a way of associating positive public connotations with those who possess a naturalistic worldview. He has given support to the idea of a free-thinking school, which would not "indoctrinate children" but would instead teach children to ask for evidence and be skeptical, critical, and open-minded. Such a school, says Dawkins, should "teach comparative religion, and teach it properly without any bias towards particular religions, and including historically important but dead religions, such as those of ancient Greece and the Norse gods, if only because these, like the Abrahamic scriptures, are important for understanding English literature and European history." Inspired by the consciousness-raising successes of feminists in arousing widespread embarrassment at the routine use of "he" instead of "she", Dawkins similarly suggests that phrases such as "Catholic child" and "Muslim child" should be considered as socially absurd as, for instance, "Marxist child", as he believes that children should not be classified based on the ideological or religious beliefs of their parents.

While some critics, such as writer Christopher Hitchens, psychologist Steven Pinker and Nobel laureates Sir Harold Kroto, James D. Watson, and Steven Weinberg have defended Dawkins's stance on religion and praised his work, others, including Nobel Prize-winning theoretical physicist Peter Higgs, astrophysicist Martin Rees, philosopher of science Michael Ruse, literary critic Terry Eagleton, philosopher Roger Scruton, academic and social critic Camille Paglia, atheist philosopher Daniel Came and theologian Alister McGrath, have criticised Dawkins on various grounds, including the assertion that his work simply serves as an atheist counterpart to religious fundamentalism rather than a productive critique of it, and that he has fundamentally misapprehended the foundations of the theological positions he claims to refute. Rees and Higgs, in particular, have both rejected Dawkins's confrontational stance toward religion as narrow and "embarrassing", with Higgs going as far as to equate Dawkins with the religious fundamentalists he criticises. Atheist philosopher John Gray has denounced Dawkins as an "anti-religious missionary", whose assertions are "in no sense novel or original," suggesting that "transfixed in wonderment at the workings of his own mind, Dawkins misses much that is of importance in human beings." Gray has also criticised Dawkins's perceived allegiance to Darwin, stating that if "science, for Darwin, was a method of inquiry that enabled him to edge tentatively and humbly toward the truth, for Dawkins, science is an unquestioned view of the world." A 2016 study found that many British scientists held an unfavourable view of Dawkins and his attitude towards religion.
In response to his critics, Dawkins maintains that theologians are no better than scientists in addressing deep cosmological questions and that he is not a fundamentalist, as he is willing to change his mind in the face of new evidence.

Dawkins has faced backlash over some of his public comments about Islam. In 2013, Dawkins tweeted that "All the world's Muslims have fewer Nobel Prizes than Trinity College, Cambridge. They did great things in the Middle Ages, though." In 2016, Dawkins' invitation to speak at the Northeast Conference on Science and Skepticism was withdrawn over his sharing of what was characterized as a "highly offensive video" satirically showing cartoon feminist and Islamist characters singing about the things they hold in common. In issuing the tweet, Dawkins stated that it "Obviously doesn’t apply to vast majority of feminists, among whom I count myself. But the minority are pernicious."

Criticism of creationism 

Dawkins is a prominent critic of creationism, a religious belief that humanity, life, and the universe were created by a deity without recourse to evolution. He has described the young Earth creationist view that the Earth is only a few thousand years old as "a preposterous, mind-shrinking falsehood". His 1986 book, The Blind Watchmaker, contains a sustained critique of the argument from design, an important creationist argument. In the book, Dawkins argues against the watchmaker analogy made famous by the eighteenth-century English theologian William Paley via his book Natural Theology, in which Paley argues that just as a watch is too complicated and too functional to have sprung into existence merely by accident, so too must all living things—with their far greater complexity—be purposefully designed. Dawkins shares the view generally held by scientists that natural selection is sufficient to explain the apparent functionality and non-random complexity of the biological world, and can be said to play the role of watchmaker in nature, albeit as an automatic, unguided by any designer, nonintelligent, blind watchmaker.

In 1986, Dawkins and biologist John Maynard Smith participated in an Oxford Union debate against A. E. Wilder-Smith (a Young Earth creationist) and Edgar Andrews (president of the Biblical Creation Society). In general, however, Dawkins has followed the advice of his late colleague Stephen Jay Gould and refused to participate in formal debates with creationists because "what they seek is the oxygen of respectability", and doing so would "give them this oxygen by the mere act of engaging with them at all". He suggests that creationists "don't mind being beaten in an argument. What matters is that we give them recognition by bothering to argue with them in public." In a December 2004 interview with American journalist Bill Moyers, Dawkins said that "among the things that science does know, evolution is about as certain as anything we know." When Moyers questioned him on the use of the word theory, Dawkins stated that "evolution has been observed. It's just that it hasn't been observed while it's happening." He added that "it is rather like a detective coming on a murder after the scene... the detective hasn't actually seen the murder take place, of course. But what you do see is a massive clue... Huge quantities of circumstantial evidence. It might as well be spelled out in words of English."

Dawkins has opposed the inclusion of intelligent design in science education, describing it as "not a scientific argument at all, but a religious one". He has been referred to in the media as "Darwin's Rottweiler", a reference to English biologist T. H. Huxley, who was known as "Darwin's Bulldog" for his advocacy of Charles Darwin's evolutionary ideas. He has been a strong critic of the British organisation Truth in Science, which promotes the teaching of creationism in state schools, and whose work Dawkins has described as an "educational scandal". He plans to subsidise schools through the Richard Dawkins Foundation for Reason and Science with the delivery of books, DVDs, and pamphlets that counteract their work.

Political views 

Dawkins is an outspoken atheist and a supporter of various atheist, secular, and humanist organisations, including Humanists UK and the Brights movement. Dawkins suggests that atheists should be proud, not apologetic, stressing that atheism is evidence of a healthy, independent mind. He hopes that the more atheists identify themselves, the more the public will become aware of just how many people are nonbelievers, thereby reducing the negative opinion of atheism among the religious majority. Inspired by the gay rights movement, he endorsed the Out Campaign to encourage atheists worldwide to declare their stance publicly. He supported a UK atheist advertising initiative, the Atheist Bus Campaign in 2008 and 2009, which aimed to raise funds to place atheist advertisements on buses in the London area.

Dawkins has expressed concern about the growth of the human population and about the matter of overpopulation. In The Selfish Gene, he briefly mentions population growth, giving the example of Latin America, whose population, at the time the book was written, was doubling every 40 years. He is critical of Roman Catholic attitudes to family planning and population control, stating that leaders who forbid contraception and "express a preference for 'natural' methods of population limitation" will get just such a method in the form of starvation.

As a supporter of the Great Ape Project—a movement to extend certain moral and legal rights to all great apes—Dawkins contributed the article 'Gaps in the Mind' to the Great Ape Project book edited by Paola Cavalieri and Peter Singer. In this essay, he criticises contemporary society's moral attitudes as being based on a "discontinuous, speciesist imperative".

Dawkins also regularly comments in newspapers and blogs on contemporary political questions and is a frequent contributor to the online science and culture digest 3 Quarks Daily. His opinions include opposition to the 2003 invasion of Iraq, the British nuclear deterrent, the actions of then-US President George W. Bush, and the ethics of designer babies. Several such articles were included in A Devil's Chaplain, an anthology of writings about science, religion, and politics. He is also a supporter of Republic's campaign to replace the British monarchy with a democratically elected president. Dawkins has described himself as a Labour voter in the 1970s and voter for the Liberal Democrats since the party's creation. In 2009, he spoke at the party's conference in opposition to blasphemy laws, alternative medicine, and faith schools. In the UK general election of 2010, Dawkins officially endorsed the Liberal Democrats, in support of their campaign for electoral reform and for their "refusal to pander to 'faith. In the run up to the 2017 general election, Dawkins once again endorsed the Liberal Democrats and urged voters to join the party.

In April 2021, Dawkins said on Twitter that "In 2015, Rachel Dolezal, a white chapter president of NAACP, was vilified for identifying as Black. Some men choose to identify as women, and some women choose to identify as men. You will be vilified if you deny that they literally are what they identify as. Discuss." After receiving criticism for this tweet, Dawkins responded by saying that "I do not intend to disparage trans people. I see that my academic "Discuss" question has been misconstrued as such and I deplore this. It was also not my intent to ally in any way with Republican bigots in US now exploiting this issue."  The American Humanist Association retracted Dawkins' 1996 Humanist of the Year Award in response to these comments.

Dawkins has voiced his support for the Campaign for the Establishment of a United Nations Parliamentary Assembly, an organisation that campaigns for democratic reform in the United Nations, and the creation of a more accountable international political system.

Dawkins identifies as a feminist. He has said that feminism is "enormously important". However, Dawkins has also been accused by writers such as Amanda Marcotte, Caitlin Dickson, and Adam Lee of misogyny, criticizing those who speak about sexual harassment and abuse while ignoring sexism within the New Atheist movement.

Views on postmodernism 
In 1998, in a book review published in Nature, Dawkins expressed his appreciation for two books connected with the Sokal affair, Higher Superstition: The Academic Left and Its Quarrels with Science by Paul R. Gross and Norman Levitt and Intellectual Impostures by Sokal and Jean Bricmont. These books are famous for their criticism of postmodernism in U.S. universities (namely in the departments of literary studies, anthropology, and other cultural studies).

Echoing many critics, Dawkins holds that postmodernism uses obscurantist language to hide its lack of meaningful content. As an example he quotes the psychoanalyst Félix Guattari: "We can clearly see that there is no bi-univocal correspondence between linear signifying links or archi-writing, depending on the author, and this multireferential, multi-dimensional machinic catalysis." This is explained, Dawkins maintains, by certain intellectuals' academic ambitions. Figures like Guattari or Lacan, according to Dawkins, have nothing to say but want to reap the benefits of reputation and fame that derive from a successful academic career: "Suppose you are an intellectual impostor with nothing to say, but with strong ambitions to succeed in academic life, collect a coterie of reverent disciples and have students around the world anoint your pages with respectful yellow highlighter. What kind of literary style would you cultivate? Not a lucid one, surely, for clarity would expose your lack of content."

Other fields 

In his role as professor for public understanding of science, Dawkins has been a critic of pseudoscience and alternative medicine. His 1998 book Unweaving the Rainbow considers John Keats's accusation that by explaining the rainbow, Isaac Newton diminished its beauty; Dawkins argues for the opposite conclusion. He suggests that deep space, the billions of years of life's evolution, and the microscopic workings of biology and heredity contain more beauty and wonder than do "myths" and "pseudoscience". For John Diamond's posthumously published Snake Oil, a book devoted to debunking alternative medicine, Dawkins wrote a foreword in which he asserts that alternative medicine is harmful, if only because it distracts patients from more successful conventional treatments and gives people false hopes. Dawkins states that "There is no alternative medicine. There is only medicine that works and medicine that doesn't work." In his 2007 Channel 4 TV film The Enemies of Reason, Dawkins concluded that Britain is gripped by "an epidemic of superstitious thinking".

Continuing a long-standing partnership with Channel 4, Dawkins participated in a five-part television series, Genius of Britain, along with fellow scientists Stephen Hawking, James Dyson, Paul Nurse, and Jim Al-Khalili. The series was first broadcast in June 2010, and focuses on major, British, scientific achievements throughout history.

In 2014, he joined the global awareness movement Asteroid Day as a "100x Signatory".

Awards and recognition 

He holds honorary doctorates in science from the University of Huddersfield, University of Westminster, Durham University, the University of Hull, the University of Antwerp, the University of Oslo, the University of Aberdeen, Open University, the Vrije Universiteit Brussel, and the University of Valencia. He also holds honorary doctorates of letters from the University of St Andrews and the Australian National University (HonLittD, 1996), and was elected Fellow of the Royal Society of Literature in 1997 and a Fellow of the Royal Society (FRS) in 2001. He is one of the patrons of the Oxford University Scientific Society.

In 1987, Dawkins received a Royal Society of Literature award and a Los Angeles Times Literary Prize for his book The Blind Watchmaker. In the same year, he received a Sci. Tech Prize for Best Television Documentary Science Programme of the Year for his work on the BBC's Horizon episode The Blind Watchmaker.

In 1996, the American Humanist Association gave him their Humanist of the Year Award, but the award was withdrawn in 2021, with the statement that he "demean[ed] marginalized groups", including transgender people, using "the guise of scientific discourse".

Other awards include the Zoological Society of London's Silver Medal (1989), the Finlay Innovation Award (1990), the Michael Faraday Award (1990), the Nakayama Prize (1994), the fifth International Cosmos Prize (1997), the Kistler Prize (2001), the Medal of the Presidency of the Italian Republic (2001), the 2001 and 2012 Emperor Has No Clothes Award from the Freedom From Religion Foundation, the Bicentennial Kelvin Medal of The Royal Philosophical Society of Glasgow (2002), the Golden Plate Award of the American Academy of Achievement (2006), and the Nierenberg Prize for Science in the Public Interest (2009). He was awarded the Deschner Award, named after German anti-clerical author Karlheinz Deschner. The Committee for Skeptical Inquiry (CSICOP) has awarded Dawkins their highest award In Praise of Reason (1992).

Dawkins topped Prospect magazine's 2004 list of the top 100 public British intellectuals, as decided by the readers, receiving twice as many votes as the runner-up. He was shortlisted as a candidate in their 2008 follow-up poll. In a poll held by Prospect in 2013, Dawkins was voted the world's top thinker based on 65 names chosen by a largely US and UK-based expert panel.

In 2005, the Hamburg-based Alfred Toepfer Foundation awarded him its Shakespeare Prize in recognition of his "concise and accessible presentation of scientific knowledge". He won the Lewis Thomas Prize for Writing about Science for 2006, as well as the Galaxy British Book Awards's Author of the Year Award for 2007. In the same year, he was listed by Time magazine as one of the 100 most influential people in the world in 2007, and was ranked 20th in The Daily Telegraph 2007 list of 100 greatest living geniuses.

Since 2003, the Atheist Alliance International has awarded a prize during its annual conference, honouring an outstanding atheist whose work has done the most to raise public awareness of atheism during that year; it is known as the Richard Dawkins Award, in honour of Dawkins's own efforts. In February 2010, Dawkins was named to the Freedom From Religion Foundation's Honorary Board of distinguished achievers.

In 2012, a Sri Lankan team of ichthyologists headed by Rohan Pethiyagoda named a new genus of freshwater fish, Dawkinsia, in Dawkins's honor. (Members of this genus were formerly members of the genus Puntius).

Personal life 
Dawkins has been married three times and has a daughter. On 19 August 1967, Dawkins married ethologist Marian Stamp in the Protestant church in Annestown, County Waterford, Ireland; they divorced in 1984. On 1 June 1984, he married Eve Barham (1951–1999) in Oxford. They had a daughter, Juliet Emma Dawkins (born 1984, Oxford). Dawkins and Barham divorced. In 1992, he married actress Lalla Ward in Kensington and Chelsea, London. Dawkins met her through their mutual friend Douglas Adams, who had worked with her on the BBC's Doctor Who. Dawkins and Ward separated in 2016 and they later described the separation as "entirely amicable". He identifies as an atheist who is a "cultural Anglican," associated with the Church of England, and a "secular Christian".

On 6 February 2016, Dawkins suffered a minor haemorrhagic stroke while at home. Dawkins reported later that same year that he had almost completely recovered.

Dawkins was featured as the voice of Q42/Computer in the 2020 American thriller film Intersect.

Media

Selected publications 

 
 
 
 
 
 
 
 
 
 
 
 
 . First volume of his memoirs. 
 . Second volume of his memoirs.

Documentary films 
 Nice Guys Finish First (1986)
 The Blind Watchmaker (1987)
 Growing Up in the Universe (1991)
 Break the Science Barrier (1996)
 The Atheism Tapes (2004)
 The Big Question (2005) – Part 3 of the TV series, titled "Why Are We Here?"
 The Root of All Evil? (2006)
 The Enemies of Reason (2007)
 The Genius of Charles Darwin (2008)
 Faith School Menace? (2010)
 Beautiful Minds (April 2012) – BBC4 documentary
 Sex, Death and the Meaning of Life (2012)
 The Unbelievers (2013)

Other appearances 

Dawkins has made many television appearances on news shows providing his political opinions and especially his views as an atheist. He has been interviewed on the radio, often as part of his book tours. He has debated many religious figures. He has made many university speaking appearances, again often in coordination with his book tours. As of 2016, he has over 60 credits in the Internet Movie Database where he appeared as himself.
 Expelled: No Intelligence Allowed (2008) – as himself, presented as a leading scientific opponent of intelligent design in a film that contends that the mainstream science establishment suppresses academics who believe they see evidence of intelligent design in nature and who criticise evidence supporting Darwinian evolution
 Doctor Who: "The Stolen Earth" (2008) – as himself
 Inside Nature's Giants (2009–12) – as guest expert
 The Simpsons: "Black Eyed, Please" (2013) – appears in Ned Flanders' dream of Hell; provided voice as a demon version of himself
 Endless Forms Most Beautiful (2015) – by Nightwish: Finnish symphonic metal band Nightwish had Dawkins as a guest star on the album. He provides narration on two tracks: "Shudder Before the Beautiful", in which he opens the album with one of his own quotes, and "The Greatest Show on Earth", inspired by and named after his book The Greatest Show on Earth: The Evidence for Evolution, and in which he quotes On the Origin of Species by Charles Darwin. He subsequently performed his parts live with Nightwish on 19 December 2015 at the Wembley Arena in London; the concert was later released as a part of a live album/DVD titled Vehicle of Spirit.

Notes 

a.  W. D. Hamilton influenced Dawkins and the influence can be seen throughout Dawkins's book The Selfish Gene. They became friends at Oxford and following Hamilton's death in 2000, Dawkins wrote his obituary and organised a secular memorial service.

b.  The debate ended with the motion "That the doctrine of creation is more valid than the theory of evolution" being defeated by 198 votes to 115.

References

Selected bibliography

On Dawkins

External links 

 The Richard Dawkins Foundation for Reason and Science
 Richard Dawkins Personal Website
 
 
 
 
 
 Richard Dawkins – latest news at The Independent
 Richard Dawkins at The New York Times
 Richard Dawkins at Big Think

 
1941 births
20th-century atheists
20th-century British biologists
20th-century English male writers
20th-century English non-fiction writers
20th-century English philosophers
21st-century atheists
21st-century British biologists
21st-century English male writers
21st-century English non-fiction writers
21st-century English philosophers
21st-century English memoirists
Alumni of Balliol College, Oxford
Articles containing video clips
Atheist feminists
English atheist writers
British atheism activists
British critics of Islam
British secularists
British zoologists
Critics of religions
Critics of alternative medicine
Critics of conspiracy theories
Critics of creationism
Critics of neoconservatism
Critics of new religious movements
Critics of postmodernism
Critics of the Catholic Church
Education activists
English biologists
English activists
English atheists
English feminists
English humanists
English republicans
English sceptics
English science writers
English social commentators
Ethologists
British evolutionary biologists
Evolutionary psychologists
Fellows of New College, Oxford
Fellows of the Royal Society
Fellows of the Royal Society of Literature
Former Anglicans
Genetics education
Living people
Male feminists
Modern synthesis (20th century)
New Atheism
New College of the Humanities
People educated at Chafyn Grove School
People educated at Oundle School
People stripped of awards
Philosophers of culture
Philosophers of education
Philosophers of science
Psychology writers
Recipients of the Medal of the Presidency of the Italian Republic
Science activists
Secular humanists
Simonyi Professors for the Public Understanding of Science
Theorists on Western civilization
University of California, Berkeley faculty
White Kenyan people
Writers about religion and science
Writers from Nairobi